John Thomas Fowlkes Jr. (born April 20, 1951) is a Senior United States district judge of the United States District Court for the Western District of Tennessee.

Biography

Born in Washington, D.C., Judge Fowlkes received his Bachelor of Arts Degree in 1975 from Valparaiso University. He received his Juris Doctor in 1977 from the University of Denver School of Law. He began his career as an Assistant Public Defender in the Shelby County Public Defender's Office in Memphis, Tennessee. He served as an Assistant District Attorney General in the Shelby County District Attorney General's Office from 1979 to 1989. He then served as an Assistant United States Attorney in the Western District of Tennessee from 1989 to 2002. He was Chief Administrative Officer of the Shelby County Government from 2002 to 2007. He was a judge of the Shelby County Criminal Court from 2007 to 2012.

Federal judicial service

On December 16, 2011, President Barack Obama nominated Judge Fowlkes to be a District Judge for the United States District Court for the Western District of Tennessee. He would replace Judge Bernice Bouie Donald who was elevated to the United States Court of Appeals for the Sixth Circuit on September 8, 2011. He received a hearing before the Senate Judiciary Committee on March 14, 2012, and his nomination was reported to the floor on April 19, 2012, by voice vote, with Senator Lee recorded as voting no. The full Senate voted to confirm Fowlkes in a 94–2 vote on July 10, 2012. He received his commission on August 1, 2012. He assumed  senior status on September 1, 2022.

See also 
 List of African-American federal judges
 List of African-American jurists

References

External links

1951 births
Living people
African-American judges
Assistant United States Attorneys
Judges of the United States District Court for the Western District of Tennessee
People from Shelby County, Tennessee
Public defenders
Tennessee state court judges
United States district court judges appointed by Barack Obama
21st-century American judges
University of Denver alumni
Valparaiso University alumni